Haplochromis rudolfianus is a species of cichlid endemic to Lake Turkana.  This species can reach a length of  SL.

References 

rudolfianus
Freshwater fish of Kenya
Fish of Lake Turkana
Fish described in 1933
Taxonomy articles created by Polbot